Nina Claire Temple (born 21 April 1956) is a British politician who was the last Secretary of the Communist Party of Great Britain and was formerly a think-tank director in the United Kingdom.

Early life
Temple was born in Westminster, London, the daughter of Barbara J. (Rainnie) and Landon Roy Temple. Born into a communist family (her father ran Progressive Tours and was a Communist Party of Great Britain member), she joined the Young Communist League when she was 13, later protesting in London against the Vietnam War. She has a degree in materials science from Imperial College, London. She is the sister of film director Julien Temple and the aunt of actress Juno Temple.

Communist Party of Great Britain
During the late 1970s she was general secretary of the Young Communist League and became a prominent member of the Eurocommunist grouping within the party. She became a member of the CPGB executive in 1979, and then a member of the Political Committee in January 1982.

She was the Press and Publicity Officer of the CPGB from January 1983 until 1989, when she became the last (General) Secretary of the party in January 1990, aged 33. She pledged to make the party "feminist and green, as well as democratically socialist." In this role Temple became one of the leading proponents of the dissolution of the CPGB in November 1991 and the founding of its legal successor, the Democratic Left.

Think tanks
The Democratic Left continued through the 1990s, becoming the New Politics Network in 1999. Temple was its first director and worked for five years for the Make Votes Count Coalition.

In June 2005 she started work as head of Development and Communications at the Social Market Foundation, a role she held until 2008.

Personal life
Temple has two children with a schoolteacher, a daughter born in 1987 and a son born in 1988.

Temple became ill with Parkinson's disease in 2000. She trained in counselling at the Gestalt Centre in Old Street, and in September 2003 founded Sing For Joy, a choir of people with chronic degenerative diseases.

References

External links
Photo of Nina Temple in March 1992

Communist Party of Great Britain members
Young Communist League of Britain members
1956 births
Living people
People with Parkinson's disease
Institute directors
Leaders of political parties in the United Kingdom
Socialist feminists
Alumni of Imperial College London